Dar Hussein, is an old palace in the medina of Tunis.

Localization
It is located in 4 the castle's place in Bab Mnara district.

History 

This palace was the house of many princes, deys and beys for centuries. Each one of them added his personal touch and extended it more.

The current decoration of the palace was Youssef Saheb Ettabaa’s choice.

In 1858, Dar Hussein became the first municipal council of Tunis and got the name of Dar El Achra (House of the ten) as it had 10 members.

In 1881, the French general Léonard-Léopold Forgemol de Bostquénard stayed in the Dar Hussein for the whole occupation period.

After 1957, became the main office for the National Institute of Heritage.

Etymology
It got its name from its last owner, the General Hussein who was a very close friend to Hayreddin Pasha.

References

External links 

Hussein